James Hall (born November 18, 1983) is an American sports shooter. He competed in the men's 10 metre air pistol event at the 2020 Summer Olympics.

References

External links
 

1983 births
Living people
American male sport shooters
Olympic shooters of the United States
Shooters at the 2020 Summer Olympics
People from Shelby County, Alabama
Sportspeople from Alabama
20th-century American people
21st-century American people